The following is a list of animated television series originating in the United States of America.

American animated television series
For shows produced by entities that have since been re-organized, their former names are listed in brackets. All channels listed are American unless otherwise noted.

See also 
 List of American animated television series by episode count

References

Animated series
Animated
Lists of animated television series